The president of the Federal Chamber was the presiding officer of one of the chambers of that legislature.

Below is a list of office-holders from 1963:

Vice-presidents

Sources
Various editions of The Europa World Year Book

Federal Chamber, Presidents
Yugoslavia, Federal